Daniela Petrova is a Bulgaria-born American writer, living in New York City. Her debut novel is Her Daughter's Mother (2019).

Early life and education
Petrova was born and raised in Sofia, Bulgaria. Soon after the fall of Communism, she moved to New York City.

She earned a BA in Philosophy from Columbia University and an MA in Counseling for Mental Health and Wellness from New York University.

Her Daughter's Mother
Her Daughter's Mother is, according to Randle Browning writing in the Los Angeles Review of Books, a "psychological thriller, part murder mystery", "a deep dive into the oft-underrepresented world of infertility, pregnancy, and motherhood"—"from fertility treatments to egg donation to surrogacy to adoption"—"including all the medical, legal, and emotional obstacles women face".

Personal life
Between at least 2011 and 2014, Petrova was married to American author, journalist and filmmaker Sebastian Junger.

Publications
Her Daughter's Mother. New York City: Putnam, 2019. .

References

External links

21st-century American novelists
21st-century American women writers
Columbia College (New York) alumni
New York University alumni
Bulgarian emigrants to the United States
Writers from Sofia
Living people
Year of birth missing (living people)